Stephanie Kalu (born 8 May 1993) is an American born Nigerian sprinter who specializes in the 100 metres, 200 metres and 4 x 100 metres. She has represented Nigeria at several meets including the 2012 World Junior Championships in Athletics, 2013 Summer Universiade and the 2013 World Championships in Athletics. She will also compete at the 2015 World Championships in Athletics while representing Nigeria.

References

External links
 
 All Athletics Profile

1993 births
Living people
Nigerian female sprinters
American female sprinters
World Athletics Championships athletes for Nigeria
African-American female track and field athletes
American sportspeople of Nigerian descent
Track and field athletes from Texas
21st-century African-American sportspeople
21st-century African-American women